Jan  Daniel Preysler, also known as Johan Daniel Preyssler or Johann Daniel Preyßler (1768, Prague – 23 April 1839)  was a Czech entomologist.

In  1789  he became an adjunct to the Imperial administrative office in Prague, where he was in 1801 promoted to Administrator, and in 1805 became a Counselor. After that, in  1807  he was  board member of  the St. John the Baptist Orphanage in Prague. Between 1808 and 1832 are no records of his life—he probably lived outside Prague or abroad. He returned to Bohemia   in  1833 as a mining engineer in Zbiroh.
Preysler worked mainly on Coleoptera but also on other insects and spiders.

Works
1790 Verzeichnis böhmischen Insekten. Prag, 108 pp + 2 medirytiny.
1791 Beschreibungen und Abbildungen derjenigen Insekten, welche in Sammlungen nicht aufzubewahren sind, dann aller, die noch ganz neu, und solcher, von denen wir noch keine oder doch sehr schlechte Abbildung besitzen. In: Mayer, J. (ed.): Sammlung physikalischer Aufsätze, besonders die Böhmische Naturgeschichte betreffend, von einer Gesellschaft Böhmischer Naturforscher. I. Dresden: p. 55 – 151.
Preysler, J. D.& Lindacker J. T. & Hofer J. K.: 1793, Beobachtungen über Gegenstände der Natur auf einer Reise durch den Böhmerwald im Sommer 1791. In: Mayer J. (ed.): Sammlung physikalischer Aufsätze, besonders die Böhmische Naturgeschichte betreffend, von einer Gesellschaft Böhmischer Naturforscher. III. Dresden: p. 135 – 378.

New species described by Preysler include Claviger testaceus Preysler, 1790, Cheilosia rufipes Preysler, 1793,Aranea folium Preysler, 1791 and Chrysopilus asiliformis Preysler, 1791. His collection of insects is lost, but several specimens of insects are preserved in the Prague National Museum.

References
Koleška, Z.: 1990, Seznam biografií čs. entomologů 12. (entomologové nežijíci) [Popp – Rippl]. In: Zprávy čs. spol. ent., ČSAV, 26: p. 413 – 452, Tab. 27 – 29: p. 421 – 423.
Groll, E. K. [ed.]: 2006, Entomologen der Welt (Biographien, Sammlungsverbleib). Datenbank 2. Version, DEI im ZALF e. V.: Preysler, Jan Daniel“: (internet).

Czech entomologists
1768 births
1839 deaths